Kaur is the surname used by Sikh women and some Hindu women 

Kaur may also refer to:

People 
 Avneet Kaur (born 2001), an Indian actress
 Ashnoor Kaur (born 2004), an Indian actress
 Judith Kaur (born 1945), American oncologist
 Ash Kaur, a fictional character from EastEnders
 Kaur (given name)

Other uses 
 KAUR (satellite bus), a satellite bus designed and manufactured by ISS Reshetnev

See also